Denmark competed at the 1960 Summer Olympics in Rome, Italy. 100 competitors, 88 men and 12 women, took part in 46 events in 15 sports. Cyclist Knud Enemark Jensen died during the team time trial.

Medalists

Gold
 Paul Elvstrøm — Sailing, men's Finn individual competition
 Erik Hansen — Canoeing, men's K1 1,000 metres kayak singles

Silver
 Hans Fogh and Ole Erik Petersen — Sailing, Flying Dutchman
 William Berntsen, Steen Christensen and Søren Hancke — Sailing, 5.5 Metre
 Poul Andersen, John Danielsen, Henning Enoksen, Henry From, Bent Hansen, Poul Jensen, Flemming Nielsen, Hans Nielsen, Harald Nielsen, Poul Pedersen, Jørn Sørensen and Tommy Troelsen — Football (soccer), men's team competition

Bronze
 Erik Hansen, Arne Høyer, Erling Jessen and Helmuth Nyborg — Canoeing, men's K1 4x500 metres kayak relay

Athletics

Boxing

Canoeing

Cycling

Eight male cyclists represented Denmark in 1960.

Team time trial
 Knud Enemark Jensen
 Vagn Bangsborg
 Niels Baunsøe
 Jørgen Jørgensen

Team pursuit
 John Lundgren
 Leif Larsen
 Jens Sørensen
 Kurt vid Stein

Diving

Equestrian

Fencing

One fencer represented Denmark in 1960.

Men's sabre
 Palle Frey

Football

Hockey

Modern pentathlon

One male pentathlete represented Denmark in 1960.

Individual
 Benny Schmidt

Rowing

Denmark had 16 male rowers participate in five out of seven rowing events in 1960.

 Men's double sculls
 Jannik Madum Andersen
 Poul Mortensen

 Men's coxless pair
 Tage Grøndahl
 Elo Tostenæs

 Men's coxed pair
 Jens Berendt Jensen
 Knud Nielsen
 Sven Lysholt Hansen (cox)

 Men's coxless four
 Hugo Christiansen
 Mogens Jensen
 Børge Kaas Andersen
 Ole Kassow

 Men's coxed four
 Poul Justesen
 Mogens Pedersen
 Svend Helge Hansen
 Erik Rask
 Ejgo Vejby Nielsen (cox)

Sailing

Open

Shooting

Four shooters represented Denmark in 1960.

25 m pistol
 Per Nielsen

300 m rifle, three positions
 Uffe Schultz Larsen
 Egon Stephansen

50 m rifle, three positions
 Niels Petersen
 Uffe Schultz Larsen

50 m rifle, prone
 Egon Stephansen
 Niels Petersen

Swimming

Wrestling

References

External links
Official Olympic Reports
International Olympic Committee results database

Nations at the 1960 Summer Olympics
1960
Summer Olympics